Aaron Craze is an English celebrity chef who often appears in the ITV Food series Saturday Cookbook. He also presented CBBC shows Junior Bake Off and Pet School.

References 

British chefs
Living people
Year of birth missing (living people)
Place of birth missing (living people)